Dale Raoul (born Karen Dale Raoul; August 16, 1955) is an American film and television actress perhaps best known for her role as Maxine Fortenberry, mother of Hoyt Fortenberry, on the HBO television series True Blood.

Career
Raoul was born in Missoula, Montana. She began her professional acting career at the Old Globe Theatre in San Diego, California, where she appeared in Hamlet and The Taming of the Shrew. She went on to perform in many regional theatres before moving to Los Angeles.

Raoul earned her first screen credit in an episode of Murder, She Wrote in 1986. Since then, she has been featured in over fifty film and television productions. She appeared in a two-episode arc (Season 5, Episodes 1 and 2 "Weight Loss") as Ronni, Pam's replacement secretary at Dunder Mifflin, on the television series The Office. She made a guest appearance on the hit television sitcom Friends as a tenant in Ross's building ("The One With The Stain"). Raoul has also appeared on The Middle, Six Feet Under, NYPD Blue, The Drew Carey Show, Designing Women, Nash Bridges, Party of Five, Sabrina the Teenage Witch and Knots Landing, among many others.

From 2008 to 2014, Raoul played town busybody Maxine Fortenberry on HBO's True Blood, and she also guests starred in The Office as Ronnie, the new receptionist. From 2013 to 2014, she had a recurring role in the CBS series Under The Dome, playing Andrea Grinnell. In 2015, she appeared in The Bronze, which premiered opening night at the Sundance Film Festival. That same year, she starred in the comedic short film "Open 24 Hours," which screened in competition at the Palm Springs International Festival of Short Films, Raindance Film Festival and Rhode Island International Film Festival.

Raoul has also worked as a voice actor.

Personal life
Raoul has been married to Ray Thompson since June 16, 1986. Thompson is a six-time Emmy Award-winning lighting designer for his work on The Young and the Restless. They are avid supporters of the Los Angeles Opera and various animal shelter and adoption charities. Raoul and Thompson currently reside in Los Angeles, California.

Filmography 
 The Lawnmower Man (1992) as Dolly
 Blast from the Past (1999) as Mom
 The Mexican (2001) as Estelle
 Friends (2001) as Mrs. Verhoeven
 Seven Pounds (2008) as St. Matthews Volunteer
 The Office (TV series) (2008-2009) as Ronni
 Grey's Anatomy (2011) as NICU Nurse
 The Pretty One (2013) as Mrs. Shoemacher
 Under the Dome (TV series) (2013-2014) as Andrea Grinnell
 The Bronze (2015) as Doris

References

External links 

 

1956 births
Living people
American film actresses
American television actresses
21st-century American women